The 2005 Armenian First League season started on 19 April 2005. The last matches were played on 8 October 2005. Pyunik-2 became the league champions, but because they are a reserve team they were unable to promote to the Armenian Premier League. As a result, the second placed team Ararat Yerevan was given promotion. The third placed team Gandzasar played in the promotion/relegation play-off, which they lost.

Overview
 Abovyan and Yerevan United joined the league.
 FC Zenit Charentsavan and FC Dinamo-VZ Yerevan are the reserve teams of Dinamo-Zenit Yerevan.
 Reserve teams, such as Pyunik-2, cannot be promoted.

League table

Promotion/relegation play-off

See also
 2005 Armenian Premier League
 2005 Armenian Cup

External links
 RSSSF: Armenia 2005 - Second Level

 

Armenian First League seasons
2
Armenia
Armenia